Pia Ranslet (born 3 July 1956, Allinge, Bornholm, Denmark) is a Danish painter and sculptor.

Biography 
Pia Ranslet was born and raised in Bornholm, Denmark, eldest daughter to Tulla Blomberg Ranslet and Arne Ranslet. Her brother is sculptor Paul Ranslet. After graduating from high school she registered at Copenhagen University, studying Art history. In 1976 she enrolled in Danmarks Designskole and after receiving her diploma proceeded studying at Konstfack University-college in Stockholm, while teaching art students. From 1980 to 1986 she studied art at the Royal Swedish Academy of Arts in Stockholm, where she was granted several scholarships allowing her to study in India, New York City and Egypt. She continued teaching art at Bornholms Højskole and Thorstedlund Kunsthøjskolen in Frederikssund. Ranslet is married and has three sons.

Art 

Ranslet's work stretches between expressionism and realism. She paints in front of her motives, and is a classic portraitist. Her landscapes feature mostly Bornholm-countryside views. She has solo-exhibited in many European countries, including: Denmark, Sweden, Germany, Luxembourg, France, Belgium, Spain and Switzerland. She is publicly represented in the Swedish National Art Council (Statens Konstråd), National Labour Market Board (Arbetsmarknadstyrelsen) and Swedish Employers Association (Arbetsgivareföreningen).

References

1956 births
Living people
People from Bornholm
Danish women painters
Danish women sculptors
20th-century Danish painters
20th-century Danish sculptors
20th-century Danish women artists
20th-century Danish artists
21st-century Danish painters
21st-century Danish sculptors
21st-century Danish women artists